Luzmila Nicolalde Cordero (born 1 June 1957) is an Ecuadorian TV presenter and politician, being the current Councillor for the Municipality of Guayaquil. She is one of the most experienced personalities in Ecuadorian television, with more than 36 years in the industry.

Biography
Luzmila Nicolalde, born 1 June 1957 in Guayaquil, entered the world of television at age 13, appearing on TC Televisión's Panorama infantil to sing. Later, she would also appear on La discoteca de Pepe Parra, then on Chispazos, running since 1987.

She was dismissed from her position by the Supreme Electoral Tribunal during the 2007 legislative crisis at the request of President Rafael Correa in order to establish the Ecuadorian Constituent Assembly. In 2009, Nicolalde emerged as a primary candidate for the Mayor of Guayaquil for the Patriotic Society Party, and she announced her intention to run. However, the PSP denied any support for Nicolalde, instead backing Jaime Nebot for reelection.

Citations

Living people
1957 births
Members of the National Congress (Ecuador)
Ecuadorian television presenters
Social Christian Party (Ecuador) politicians
Ecuadorian women television presenters
21st-century Ecuadorian women politicians
21st-century Ecuadorian politicians